Rodheim vor der Höhe station is a railway station in the Rodheim vor der Höhe district of Rosbach vor der Höhe, located in the Wetteraukreis district in Hesse, Germany.

References

Railway stations in Hesse
Buildings and structures in Wetteraukreis